The third season of the Showcase television series Continuum premiered on March 16, 2014 and concluded on June 22, 2014. The series was created by Simon Barry, and centers on Kiera Cameron (Rachel Nichols) as she travels back in time from 2077 to 2012 pursuing a group of terrorists. Kiera is focused on stopping the terrorists, unifying the time line and finding a way back to her time and family. All episode titles in this season use the word "Minute".

Cast and characters

Regular
 Rachel Nichols as Kiera Cameron
 Victor Webster as Carlos Fonnegra
 Erik Knudsen as Alec Sadler
 Stephen Lobo as Matthew Kellog
 Roger Cross as Travis Verta
 Lexa Doig as Sonya Valentine
 Luvia Petersen as Jasmine Garza
 Omari Newton as Lucas Ingram

Recurring
 Terry Chen as Curtis Chen
 Brian Markinson as Inspector Dillon
 Ian Tracey as Jason Sadler
 Magda Apanowicz as Emily / Mia Hartwell
 Jennifer Spence as Betty Robertson
 Ryan Robbins as John Doe / Brad Tonkin
 Richard Harmon as Julian Randol

Guest
 Tony Amendola as Edouard Kagame
 Mike Dopud as Stefan Jaworski

Episodes

At the end of season 2, Kiera and Alec independently time-travel a week into their past, creating a new timeline, and the series follows them into the past. For the sake of simplicity, the Kiera and Alec from the future are here termed "Red", and the Kiera and Alec from the past, "Green", named for the colors Catherine uses to represent each timeline in "Minute by Minute".

Production
On June 5, 2013, Continuum was renewed for a third season. Filming began on November 20, 2013. Season 3 premiered on March 16, 2014 on Showcase in Canada and on April 4, 2014 on the Syfy channel in the United States. The season began airing on January 28, 2015 on Syfy in the United Kingdom and Ireland.

Broadcast

Ratings

Reviews
The third season of Continuum received a 100% approval rating on Rotten Tomatoes based on 5 reviews.

References

2014 Canadian television seasons
3